Silk and Soul is an album by organist Jack McDuff recorded in 1964 and 1965 and released on the Prestige label.

Track listing 
All compositions by Jack McDuff except as indicated
 "Silk and Soul" - 8:02    
 "If Ever I Would Leave You" (Alan Jay Lerner, Frederick Loewe) - 4:17    
 "What's Shakin'?" - 2:44
 "The Morning Song" - 5:49
 "Hey Lawdy Mama" (Buddy Moss) - 4:04    
 "Scufflin'" - 4:53    
 "From the Bottom Up" (Benny Golson) - 3:47   
 "Lexington Line" - 3:26  
Recorded in Stockholm, Sweden in July 1964 (tracks 2, 5, 7 & 8) and in New York City in July 1964 (track 6) and 1965 (tracks 1, 3 & 4)

Personnel 
Jack McDuff - organ
Red Holloway - tenor saxophone, flute 
George Benson - guitar
Larry Gales - bass (tracks 1 & 4)
Joe Dukes - drums 
Montego Joe - congas (track 3)
Unidentified orchestra arranged and conducted by Benny Golson (tracks 2, 5, 7 & 8)

References 

 

Jack McDuff albums
1965 albums
Prestige Records albums
Albums arranged by Benny Golson